Your Big Family Renovation is an American reality series that began airing on HGTV, on March 3, 2015. It is hosted by Brandon and Jen Hatmaker, and centers upon them showing homes which have potential to large and growing families. The Hatmakers after the family decides on their home work with their contractors on fixing up and revitalizing the homes.

Original series
In June, 2014, one of Hatmaker's blog posts went viral when she ranted, humorously, about the burnout many parents experience at the end of the school year. NBC's Today Show interviewed Hatmaker in a segment where she joked "we all care about our kids, we all care about education, but honestly, somewhere around end of April, early May, we’re kind of over it.” After the interview was broadcast, HGTV contacted Hatmaker to discuss a possible series featuring her family.

Hatmaker discussed her family's religious lifestyle with the channel. HGTV did not have an objection; their family fit a "quirky wholesome category" that had found success with Duck Dynasty and 19 Kids and Counting. The Hatmakers starred in the 8-episode series in the summer of 2014. Hatmaker discussed the positive impact of being in a reality series on her blog. She called her family dynamics "wobbly" prior to filming due to the strains of the travel her career demanded and praised the experience of "working side-by-side together all day, every day."

Spin off
After the success of My Big Family Renovation HGTV picked up the spin off show Your Big Family Renovation. In this show the Hatmakers help other big families with their housing issues due to lack of space. They spend the next several weeks renovating the homes and ensuring the families utilize their new home to its full potential.

Episodes

My Big Family Renovation

Your Big Family Renovations

References

External links
 
 Jen Hatmaker's Website

HGTV original programming
2010s American reality television series
2015 American television series debuts